Yahyaabad (also Romanized as Yaḩyáābād; also known as Raḩīmābād) is a village in Baraan-e Shomali Rural District, in the Central District of Isfahan County, Isfahan Province, Iran. At the 2006 census, its population was 314, in 73 families.

References 

Populated places in Isfahan County